George Devadass  was the second Bishop of Madurai-Ramnad, serving from 1959 to 1978.

Before his elevation to the episcopate he served at Tambaram.

Notes

 
 

20th-century Anglican bishops in India
Indian bishops
Indian Christian religious leaders
Anglican bishops of Madurai-Ramnad